Francis Joseph McKee (25 January 1923 – 24 July 1988) was a Scottish professional footballer who played as a left half. He played in the Scottish League for Dundee United in the 1947–48 season, and in the English Football League for Birmingham City and Gillingham between 1948 and 1955. He began his career with junior club Lochgelly Albert, and went on to play for Southern League clubs Gloucester City, for whom he scored once in 26 appearances, and Kidderminster Harriers. After retiring from football he worked for South Staffordshire Water.

His grandson Jaimes McKee is also a footballer. In his playing days, he was a Hong Kong international.

References

1923 births
1988 deaths
People from Cowdenbeath
Scottish footballers
Association football wing halves
Dundee United F.C. players
Birmingham City F.C. players
Gillingham F.C. players
Gloucester City A.F.C. players
Kidderminster Harriers F.C. players
Scottish Junior Football Association players
Scottish Football League players
English Football League players
Southern Football League players
Footballers from Fife